Cyperus amauropus is a species of sedge that is native to eastern parts of Africa and the Arabian peninsula.

The species was first formally described by the botanist Ernst Gottlieb von Steudel in 1854.

See also
 List of Cyperus species

References

amauropus
Plants described in 1854
Flora of Eritrea 
Flora of Ethiopia
Flora of Kenya
Flora of Mozambique
Flora of Oman
Flora of Rwanda
Flora of Saudi Arabia
Flora of Somalia
Flora of Sudan
Taxa named by Ernst Gottlieb von Steudel
Flora of Tanzania
Flora of Uganda
Flora of Yemen